The Iguanidae is a family of lizards composed of the iguanas, chuckwallas, and their prehistoric relatives, including the widespread green iguana.

Taxonomy 
Iguanidae is thought to be the sister group to the collared lizards (family Crotaphytidae); the two groups likely diverged during the Late Cretaceous, as that is when Pristiguana and Pariguana, the two earliest fossil genera, are known from. The subfamily Iguaninae, which contains all modern genera, likely originated in the earliest Paleocene, at about 62 million years ago. The most basal extant genus, Dipsosaurus, diverged from the rest of Iguaninae during the late Eocene, about 38 million years ago, with Brachylophus following a few million years later at about 35 million years ago, presumably after its dispersal event to the Pacific. All other modern iguana genera formed in the Neogene period.

A phylogenetic tree of Iguaninae is shown here:

Description 
Iguanas and iguana-type species are diverse in terms of size, appearance, and habitat. They typically flourish in tropical, warm climates, such as regions of South America and islands in the Caribbean and in the Pacific. Iguanas typically possess dorsal spines across their back, a dewlap on the neck, sharp claws, a long whip-like tail, and a stocky, squat build. Most iguanas are arboreal, living in trees, but some species tend to be more terrestrial, which means they prefer the ground. Iguanas are typically herbivores and their diets vary based on what plant life is available within their habitat. Iguanas across many species remain oviparious, and exhibit little to no parental care when their eggs hatch. They do, however, display nest-guarding behavior. Like all reptiles, they are poikilothermic, and also rely on regular periods of basking under the sun to thermoregulate.

Distribution
All but one of modern iguana genera are native to the Americas, ranging from the deserts of the Southwestern United States through Mexico, Central America, and the Caribbean, to throughout South America down to northernmost Argentina. Some iguanas like I. iguana have spread from their native regions of Central and South America into many Pacific Islands, and even to Fiji, Japan, and Hawai'i, due to the exotic pet trade and illegal introductions into the ecosystems. Other iguanas, like the Galapagos pink iguana (C. marthae) are endemic only to specific regions on the Galapagos islands. The Grand Cayman blue iguana, C. lewisi, is endemic only to the Grand Cayman island, limited to a small wildlife reserve. The only non-American iguana species are the members of the genus Brachylophus and the extinct Lapitiguana, which are found on Fiji and formerly Tonga; their distribution is thought to be the result of the longest overwater dispersal event ever recorded for a vertebrate species, with them rafting over 8000 km across the Pacific from the Americas to the Fiji and Tonga.

Extant genera

Fossils

Classification 
Several classification schemes have been used to define the structure of this family. The "historical" classification recognized all New World iguanians, plus Brachylophus and the Madagascar oplurines, as informal groups and not as formal subfamilies.

Frost and Etheridge (1989) formally recognized these informal groupings as families.

Macey et al. (1997), in their analysis of molecular data for iguanian lizards recovered a monophyletic Iguanidae and formally recognized the eight families proposed by Frost and Etheridge (1989) as subfamilies of Iguanidae.

Schulte et al. (2003) reanalyzed the morphological data of Frost and Etheridge in combination with molecular data for all major groups of Iguanidae and recovered a monophyletic Iguanidae, but the subfamilies Polychrotinae and Tropidurinae were not monophyletic.

Townsend et al. (2011), Wiens et al. (2012) and Pyron et al. (2013), in the most comprehensive phylogenies published to date, recognized most groups  at family level, resulting in a narrower definition of Iguanidae.

Historical classification
Family Iguanidae
Informal grouping anoloids: anoles, leiosaurs, Polychrus 
Informal grouping basiliscines: casquehead lizards
Informal grouping crotaphytines: collared and leopard lizards
Informal grouping iguanines: marine, Fijian, Galapagos land, spinytail, rock, desert, green, and chuckwalla iguanas
Informal grouping morunasaurs: wood lizards, clubtails
Informal grouping oplurines: Madagascan iguanids
Informal grouping sceloporines: earless, spiny, tree, side-blotched and horned lizards
Informal grouping tropidurines: curly-tailed lizards, South American swifts, neotropical ground lizards

Frost et al. (1989) classification of iguanas
Family Corytophanidae
Family Crotaphytidae
Family Hoplocercidae
Family Iguanidae
Genus Amblyrhynchus – marine iguana
Genus Brachylophus – Fijian/Tongan iguanas
Genus Cachryx – spinytail iguanas
Genus Conolophus – Galápagos land iguanas
Genus Ctenosaura – spinytail iguanas
Genus Cyclura – West Indian rock iguanas
Genus Dipsosaurus – desert iguana
Genus Iguana – green and Lesser Antillean iguanas
Genus Sauromalus – chuckwallas
Genus Armandisaurus (extinct chuckwalla)
Genus Lapitiguana (extinct giant Fijian iguana)
Genus Pumilia (extinct Palm Springs iguana)
Genus Pristiguana (Cretaceous Brazilian iguana)
Family Opluridae
Family Phrynosomatidae
Family Polychridae
Family Tropiduridae

Macey et al. (1997) classification of Iguanidae
Family Iguanidae
Subfamily Corytophaninae: casquehead lizards
Subfamily Crotaphytinae: collared and leopard lizards
Subfamily Hoplocercinae: wood lizards, clubtails
Subfamily Iguaninae: marine, Fijian, Galapagos land, spinytail, rock, desert, green, and chuckwalla iguanas
Subfamily Oplurinae: Madagascan iguanids
Subfamily Phrynosomatinae: earless, spiny, tree, side-blotched and horned lizards
Subfamily Polychrotinae:  anoles, leiosaurs, Polychrus 
Subfamily Tropidurinae: curly-tailed lizards, neotropical ground lizards, South American swifts

Schulte et al. (2003) classification of Iguanidae
Here families and subfamilies are proposed as clade names, but may be recognized under the traditional Linnean nomenclature.

Iguanidae
 Corytophaninae: casquehead lizards
 Crotaphytinae: collared and leopard lizards
 Hoplocercinae: wood lizards, clubtails
 Iguaninae: marine, Fijian, Galapagos land, spinytail, rock, desert, green, and chuckwalla iguanas
 Oplurinae: Madagascan iguanids
 Phrynosomatinae: earless, spiny, tree, side-blotched and horned lizards
 Polychrotinae:  anoles, leiosaurs, Polychrus 
subclade of Polychrotinae Anolis:  anoles
subclade of Polychrotinae Leiosaurini:  leiosaurs
subclade of Leiosaurini Leiosaurae:  
subclade of Leiosaurini Anisolepae:  
subclade of Polychrotinae Polychrus

 Tropidurinae: curly-tailed lizards, neotropical ground lizards, South American swifts
subclade of Tropidurinae Leiocephalus: curly-tailed lizards
subclade of Tropidurinae Liolaemini: South American swifts
subclade of Tropidurinae Tropidurini: neotropical ground lizards

Townsend et al. (2011), Wiens et al. (2012) and Pyron et al. (2013) classification of Iguanidae

Family Corytophanidae
Family Crotaphytidae
Family Dactyloidae
Family Hoplocercidae
Family Iguanidae
Family Leiocephalidae
Family Leiosauridae
Family Liolaemidae
Family Opluridae
Family Phrynosomatidae
Family Polychrotidae
Family Tropiduridae

References

External links
 Family Iguanidae

 
Taxa named by Nicolaus Michael Oppel
Lizard families
Extant Early Cretaceous first appearances